The following outline is provided as an overview of and topical guide to health sciences:

Health sciences are those sciences which focus on health, or health care, as core parts of their subject matter. Health sciences relate to multiple academic disciplines, including STEM disciplines and emerging patient safety disciplines (such as social care research).

Medicine and its branches 
Medicine – applied science or practice of the diagnosis, treatment, and prevention of disease. It encompasses a variety of health care practices evolved to maintain and restore health by the prevention and treatment of illness. Some of the branches of medicine are:

Anesthesiology – branch of medicine that deals with life support and anesthesia during surgery.
Angiology - a branch of medicine that deals with the diseases of the circulatory system.
Audiology - focuses on preventing and curing hearing damage.
Bariatrics - the branch of medicine that deals with the causes, prevention, and treatment of obesity
Cardiology – branch of medicine that deals with disorders of the heart and the blood vessels.
Critical care medicine – focuses on life support and the intensive care of the seriously ill.
Dentistry - branch of medicine that consists of the study, diagnosis, prevention, and treatment of diseases, disorders, and conditions of the oral cavity, commonly in the dentition but also the oral mucosa, and of adjacent and related structures and tissues, particularly in the maxillofacial (jaw and facial) area.
Dermatology – a branch of medicine that deals with the skin, its structure, functions, and diseases.
Emergency medicine – focuses on care provided in the emergency department.
Endocrinology – the branch of medicine that deals with disorders of the endocrine system.
Family medicine - a medical specialty devoted to comprehensive health care for people of all ages.
Gastroenterology – a branch of medicine that deals with the study and care of the digestive system.
General Practice (often called Family Medicine) is a branch of medicine that specializes in primary care.
Geriatrics – the branch of medicine that deals with the general health and well-being of the elderly.
Gynecology – a branch of medicine that deals with the health of the female reproductive systems and the breasts.
Hematology – branch of medicine that deals with the blood and the circulatory system.
Hepatology – branch of medicine that deals with the liver, gallbladder and the biliary system.
Infectious disease – the branch of medicine that deals with the diagnosis and management of infectious disease, especially for complex cases and immunocompromised patients.
Kinesiology - the scientific study of human or non-human body movement.
Laboratory medicine – a branch of medicine that deals with diagnostic laboratory examinations and tests and their interpretation what makes in a medical laboratory.
Medical physics – the branch of medicine and science that deals with applications of physics concepts, theories, and methods to medicine or health care.
Neurology – a branch of medicine that deals with the brain and the nervous system.
Nephrology – a branch of medicine which deals with the kidneys.
Oncology – branch of medicine that studies of cancer.
Ophthalmology – the branch of medicine that deals with the eyes.
Orthopedics - branch of surgery concerned with conditions involving the musculoskeletal system
Otolaryngology – branch of medicine that deals the ears, nose and throat.
Pathology – the study of diseases, and the causes, processes, nature, and development of the disease.
Pediatrics – the branch of medicine that deals with the general health and well-being of children.
Pharmacy -  the art and practice of preparing, preserving, compounding, and dispensing medical drugs
Pharmacology – study and practical application of preparation, use, and effects of drugs and synthetic medicines.
Public health and preventive medicine - branch of medicine concerned with the health of populations.
Pulmonology – the branch of medicine that deals with the respiratory system.
Psychiatry – a branch of medicine that deals with the study, diagnosis, treatment, and prevention of mental disorders.
Clinical psychology Health discipline concerned with the biopsychosocial study of the mind, brain, behavior and the diagnosis, treatment and prevention of psychological disorders.
Radiology – the branch of medicine that employs medical imaging to diagnose and treat disease.
Rheumatology – a branch of medicine that deals with the diagnosis and treatment of rheumatic diseases.
Splanchnology – the branch of medicine that deals with visceral organs.
Surgery – a branch of medicine that uses operative techniques to investigate or treat both disease and injury, or to help improve bodily function or appearance.
Urology – the branch of medicine that deals with the urinary system and the male reproductive system.
Veterinary medicine – a branch of medicine that deals with the prevention, diagnosis, and treatment of disease, disorder, and injury in nonhuman/animals.

History of health sciences

 History of medicine

General health sciences concepts
 Disease 
 Healing 
 Health 
 Doctor
 Dentist 
 Physician 
 Surgeon 
 Veterinarian 
 Hospital 
 Nurse 
 Medication 
 Operation

Diagnostic methods
 Physical examination
 Auscultation 
 Percussion 
 Medical history 
 Medical imaging
 X-ray 
 CT scan 
 PET scan 
 MRI 
 SPECT (Single-photon emission computed tomography)
 Ultrasound 
 Microscopy 
 Phlebotomy
 Rating scales

See also
Academic health science centre
Biomedical sciences
List of health sciences topics
List of life sciences

External links

Links to Health Professions Websites
National Institute of Environmental Health Sciences
The US National Library of Medicine

health sciences
health sciences
 01
Health sciences